The 2020 North Dakota Democratic presidential caucuses took place on March 10, 2020, as one of several states voting the week after Super Tuesday in the Democratic Party primaries and caucuses for the 2020 presidential election. While the contest has in effect been a party-run open primary for the first time in North Dakota's history, the state party retained the traditional caucus name, classifying it as a firehouse caucus. The state awarded 18 delegates to the 2020 Democratic National Convention, of which 14 were pledged delegates allocated on the basis of the results of the election.

Senator Bernie Sanders decisively won the caucuses with almost 53% of the vote and 8 delegates over former vice president Joe Biden who won almost 40% and 6 delegates, as North Dakota was the only state on that day and the last state of the primary season to vote in favour of Sanders.

Procedure
North Dakota was one of six states (along with Democrats Abroad) which held primaries on March 10, 2020, one week after Super Tuesday. On March 13, 2019, the North Dakota Democratic–Nonpartisan League Party released its draft delegate selection plan, which moved away from the previous caucus system and called for the creation, in effect, of a party-run primary referred to by the party as a "firehouse caucus". The date was also moved back from June in 2016 to a more relevant date in March.

Voting by mail began on January 20, 2020, and continued through March 5. On March 10, polls opened and closed simultaneously throughout the state, with in-person voting through a ballot system taking place between 11:00 a.m. and 7:00 p.m. in the Central Time Zone and from 10:00 a.m. until 6:00 p.m. within the Mountain Time Zone at firehouse caucus locations across the state. Global Election Services (GES), a subsidiary of publicly traded Global Arena Holding, was retained to administer the North Dakota Democratic-NPL Presidential Primary election. In the open caucuses, candidates had to meet a threshold of 15 percent statewide in order to be considered viable. The 14 pledged delegates to the 2020 Democratic National Convention were allocated proportionally on the basis of the results of the firehouse caucus. Of these, 9 corresponded to the result of the statewide vote (coterminous with its sole congressional district) and another 2 were allocated to party leaders and elected officials (PLEO delegates), in addition to 3 at-large delegates, both also according to the statewide vote. The March primary as part of Stage I on the primary timetable received no bonus delegates, in order to disperse the primaries between more different date clusters and keep too many states from hoarding on a March date.

Following legislative district conventions between March 11 and March 14, 2020 to elect state convention delegates, the state convention met virtually between March 19 and March 21, 2020 (originally planned in Minot but cancelled due to the COVID-19 pandemic) and elected 9 national convention district delegates. Afterwards, at the meeting of the select committee on delegates on April 4, 2020, the 9 district delegates elected the 3 at-large and 2 pledged PLEO delegates for the Democratic National Convention. The delegation also included 4 unpledged PLEO delegates: 4 members of the Democratic National Committee.

Candidates 
The following candidates qualified for the ballot in North Dakota:

Running

Joe Biden
Tulsi Gabbard
Bernie Sanders

Withdrawn

Michael Bennet
Michael Bloomberg
Pete Buttigieg
John Delaney
Amy Klobuchar
Deval Patrick
Tom Steyer
Elizabeth Warren
Andrew Yang

Polling

Results

All of the withdrawn candidates had withdrawn from the race while mail-in voting had already begun.

Results by caucus site

See also 
2020 North Dakota Republican presidential caucuses

Notes

References

External links
Presidential Primary in ND by the North Dakota Democratic-NPL Party
The Green Papers delegate allocation summary
North Dakota Democratic–Nonpartisan League Party draft delegate selection plan

North Dakota Democratic
Democratic caucus
2020